Richard Graham (born 28 November 1974 in Dewsbury, West Yorkshire) is an English former football defender. The centre back joined Oldham Athletic as a trainee and went on to make over 160 league and cup appearances for the club.

References
The official Striker Tots website

Since 1888... The Searchable Premiership and Football League Player Database (subscription required)

1974 births
Living people
English footballers
Association football defenders
Premier League players
Oldham Athletic A.F.C. players
Footballers from Dewsbury